719 Albert, provisional designation , is a stony asteroid, approximately 2.5 kilometers in diameter, classified as a near-Earth object of the Amor group of asteroids. It was discovered by Austrian astronomer Johann Palisa at the Vienna Observatory on 3 October 1911, and subsequently a lost minor planet for 89 years. The asteroid was named in memory of Albert Salomon Anselm von Rothschild, an Austrian philanthropist and banker. Albert was the second Amor asteroid discovered, the first being 433 Eros.

Orbit and classification 

Albert orbits the Sun at a distance of 1.2–4.1 AU once every 4 years and 3 months (1,567 days). Its orbit has an eccentricity of 0.55 and an inclination of 12° with respect to the ecliptic. The asteroid's first observation is a precovery taken in September 1911 at Heidelberg Observatory, two weeks prior to its discovery at Vienna. The body's observation arc begins the night following its official discovery observation. Albert is also a Mars-crossing asteroid.

Close approaches 

After another close encounter in 1941, Albert will not approach Earth to a similar distance until 2078.

Discovery 

Discovered in 1911 by Johann Palisa, Albert was named after one of the Imperial Observatory in Vienna's major benefactors, Albert Salomon von Rothschild, who had died some months before. Due to inaccuracies in the asteroid's computed orbit it was subsequently lost and not recovered until 2000 by Jeffrey Larsen using data from the Spacewatch asteroid survey project. Prior to being recovered in 2000, Albert was the last "lost asteroid" among those assigned numbers (69230 Hermes was not numbered until 2003). The second-to-last "lost" numbered asteroid, 878 Mildred, had been recovered in 1991.

When it was rediscovered, Albert was mistakenly thought to be a new asteroid and was designated . Upon further investigation, however, it was noticed that its orbital plane matched up nicely with the last remaining "lost" asteroid and it was properly identified. Using the new observational data, the period was determined to be about 4.28 years instead of the 4.1 years calculated in 1911; this discrepancy was the primary reason the asteroid was lost.

Physical properties 

In the SMASS classification, Albert is a common stony S-type asteroid. Others also characterized it as a stony asteroid, while a study using Sloan photometry considers it to be an X-type asteroid.

Most of what is known about 719 Albert comes from observations taken after its rediscovery. In 2001 it passed near the Earth, allowing for a series of observations at differing phase angles. During this pass its rotational period was calculated at 5.802 hours and a measured absolute magnitude of 15.43 together with an assumed albedo of 0.12 gave a diameter of 2.8 km. Another group led by R. P. Binzel measured an absolute magnitude of 15.8; they however used an assumed albedo of 0.15 leading to a calculated diameter of 2.4 km.

The Collaborative Asteroid Lightcurve Link assumes a standard albedo for stony asteroids of 0.20 and calculates a diameter of 2.36 kilometers based on an absolute magnitude of 15.5.

Notes

References

External links 
 Asteroid Lightcurve Database (LCDB), query form (info )
 (719) Albert at EARN data base
 Dictionary of Minor Planet Names, Google books
 Asteroids and comets rotation curves, CdR – Observatoire de Genève, Raoul Behrend
 Discovery Circumstances: Numbered Minor Planets (1)-(5000) – Minor Planet Center
 
 
 

000719
Discoveries by Johann Palisa
Named minor planets
000719
19111003